"Mainland China" is a geopolitical term defined as the territory governed by the People's Republic of China (including islands such as Hainan or Chongming), excluding dependent territories of the PRC, and other territories within Greater China. By convention, the territories that fall outside of the Chinese mainland include:
 Hong Kong, a quasi-dependent territory under PRC rule that is officially designated a "Special Administrative Region of the PRC" (formerly a British colony)
 Macau, a quasi-dependent territory under PRC rule that is officially designated a "Special Administrative Region of the PRC" (formerly a Portuguese colony)
 Territories ruled by the Republic of China (ROC, commonly referred to as Taiwan), including the island of Taiwan, the Penghu (Pescadores) islands in the Taiwan Strait, and the islands Kinmen, Matsu, and Wuqiu (Kinmen) offshore of Fujian.

Overseas Chinese, especially Malaysian Chinese and Chinese Singaporeans, use this term to describe people from the "ancestral land".

Background
In the year 1949, the Chinese Communist Party (CCP) and the People's Liberation Army had largely defeated the Kuomintang (KMT)'s National Revolutionary Army in the Chinese Civil War. This forced the Kuomintang to relocate the Government and institutions of the Republic of China to the relative safety of Taiwan, an island which was placed under its control after the surrender of Japan at the end of World War II in 1945. With the establishment of the People's Republic of China on October 1, 1949, the CCP-controlled government saw itself as the sole legitimate government of China, competing with the claims of the Republic of China, whose authority is now limited to Taiwan and other islands. This resulted in a situation in which two co-existing governments competed for international legitimacy and recognition as the "government of China". With the democratisation of Taiwan in the 1990s and the rise of the Taiwanese independence movement, some people began simply using the term "China" instead.

Due to their status as colonies of foreign states during the establishment of the People's Republic of China in 1949, the phrase "mainland China" excludes Hong Kong and Macau. Since the return of Hong Kong and Macau to Chinese sovereignty in 1997 and 1999, respectively, the two territories have retained their legal, political, and economic systems. The territories also have their distinct identities. Therefore, "mainland China" generally continues to exclude these territories, because of the "One country, two systems" policy adopted by the PRC central government towards the regions. The term is also used in economic indicators, such as the IMD Competitiveness Report. International news media often use "China" to refer only to mainland China or the People's Republic of China.

Political use

People's Republic of China
The Exit and Entry Administration Law of the People's Republic of China defines two terms in Chinese that are translated to "mainland":
 Dàlù, which means 'the continent'. 
 Nèidì, literally 'inland' or 'inner land'. It excludes Hong Kong and Macau.

In the People's Republic of China, the usage of the two terms is strictly speaking not interchangeable. To emphasise the One-China principle and not give the Republic of China (ROC) "equal footing" in Cross-Strait relations, the term must be used in PRC's official contexts with reference to Taiwan (with the PRC referring to itself as the "mainland side" dealing with the "Taiwan side"). But in terms of Hong Kong and Macau, the PRC government refers to itself as "the Central People's Government".

In the People's Republic of China, the term  ('inland') is often contrasted with the term  ('outside the border') for things outside the mainland region. Examples include "Administration of Foreign-funded Banks" or the "Measures on Administration of Representative Offices of Foreign Insurance Institutions".

Hainan is an offshore island, therefore geographically not part of the continental mainland. Nevertheless, politically it is common practice to consider it part of the mainland because its government, legal and political systems do not differ from the rest of the People's Republic within the geographical mainland. Nonetheless, Hainanese people still refer to the geographic mainland as "the mainland" and call its residents "mainlanders".

Before 1949, Fujian Province (ROC), consisting of the islands of Kinmen and Matsu, was jointly governed alongside Fujian Province (PRC) as a unified Fujian Province under successive Chinese governments. The two territories are generally considered to belong to the same historical region, Fujian Province, which has been divided since 1949 as a result of the Chinese Civil War. However, because they are not controlled by the PRC, they are not included as part of "mainland China."

Hong Kong and Macau
Hong Kong and Macau are both sovereign territories of the People's Republic of China. However, due to the One Country, Two Systems policy, the two regions maintain a high degree of autonomy, hence they are not governed as part of mainland China.

Geologically speaking, Hong Kong and Macau are both connected to mainland China in certain areas (e.g. the north of the New Territories). Additionally, the islands contained within Hong Kong (e.g. Hong Kong Island) and Macau are much closer to mainland China than Taiwan and Hainan, and are much smaller.

In Hong Kong and Macau, the terms "mainland China" and "mainlander" are frequently used for people from PRC-governed areas (i.e. not Taiwan, Hong Kong, and Macau). The Chinese term Neidi, meaning the inland but still translated mainland in English, is commonly applied by SAR governments to represent non-SAR areas of PRC, including Hainan province and coastal regions of mainland China, such as "Constitutional and Mainland Affairs" and Immigration Departments. In the Mainland and Hong Kong Closer Economic Partnership Arrangement (as well as the Mainland and Macau Closer Economic Partnership Arrangement) the CPG also uses the Chinese characters  "inner land", with the note that they refer to the "customs territory of China".

Republic of China (Taiwan)
In the Republic of China, "mainland area" is a legal term used in the 1991 Additional Articles of the Constitution of the Republic of China, though the constitution does not define the geographical boundaries of the mainland area. In the corresponding Cross-Strait Act, the "people of the mainland area" are defined to be those under the jurisdiction of the PRC, excluding Hong Kong and Macau. By contrast, Taiwan and its offshore islands are defined as part of the "free area of the Republic of China". The issue on the mainland's territory also stated in the Judicial Yuan Interpretation No. 328 in 1993.

Views of the term "mainland China" (中國大陸) vary on Taiwan. The KMT had previously referred to the territories under the control of the Chinese Communist Party (CCP) by several different names, e.g. "(territory controlled by the) Communist bandits", "occupied/unfree area (of China)", "Communist China" (as opposed to either "Nationalist China" or "Democratic China"), "Red China" (as opposed to "Blue China"), and "mainland China (area)". In modern times, many of these terms have fallen out of use. The terms "mainland China" (中國大陸) or "the mainland" (大陸) still remain in popular use, but some also simply use the term "China" (中國). The former term is generally preferred by the Pan-Blue Coalition led by the KMT, while the latter term is preferred by the Pan-Green Coalition led by the Democratic Progressive Party (DPP), which opposes the term "mainland" and its suggestion that Taiwan is part of China. This has caused many political debates. The mainland concept also included the claims of the former late Qing dynasty borders such as Tibet, Outer Mongolia, Tannu Uriankhai, and Badakhshan etc.

Other terms

Other geography-related terms which are used to avoid mentioning the political status of the PRC and ROC.

See also

Mainlander
 Greater China
 Additional Articles of the Constitution of the Republic of China
 China proper
 Constitution of the People's Republic of China
 Free area of the Republic of China
 Free China
 Politics of China

Notes

References

Citations

Sources

 http://www.imd.ch/research/publications/wcy/World-Competitiveness-Yearbook-2008-Results.cfm
 

Territorial disputes of China
Territorial disputes of the Republic of China
China
Geography of China
Geopolitical terminology
Politics of Taiwan
Politics of China
Taiwan Strait